Marocchino (Caffè Marocchino) is a coffee drink created in Alessandria, Italy.

Preparation 
Generally, the glass cup is first dusted with cocoa powder, then topped with milk froth and espresso, with a second dusting of cocoa on top.

Serving style 
It is served in a small glass and consists of a shot of espresso (sometimes a small shot, or ristretto), cocoa powder and milk froth. In some regions of northern Italy, thick hot cocoa is added. In Alba, the home of the Italian chocolate giant Ferrero, Nutella is used. The name Marocchino (Italian for Moroccan) is derived from its colour, as marocchino was a type of light brown leather (see Morocco leather) used in the 1930s to make hair bands.

See also

Espressino and bicerin, similar drinks
 List of coffee beverages

References 

Coffee drinks
Chocolate drinks
Coffee in Italy
Alessandria